Musagenitsa Metro Station is a station on the Sofia Metro in Bulgaria. It opened on 8 May 2009, together with four more metro stations.

Public Transportation
None.

Location

Gallery

References

External links

 360 degrees panorama from inside the station
 Sofia Metropolitan
 Unofficial site

Sofia Metro stations
Railway stations opened in 2009
2009 establishments in Bulgaria